William Oliver may refer to:

Arts
William Oliver (artist, born 1804) (1804–1853), English landscape painter
William Oliver (artist, born 1823) (1823–1901), English figurative and genre painter
William Oliver (songwriter) (1800–1848), Newcastle upon Tyne–born songwriter
W. H. Oliver (William Hosking Oliver, 1925–2015), New Zealand writer and poet

Politics
William Oliver (Alberta politician) (1860–1951), mayor of Lethbridge, Alberta, Canada
William Oliver (Northern Ireland politician) (1912–1973), MP in the Northern Ireland Parliament for Belfast Dock
William Olyver, 15th-century MP for Gloucester
William Bacon Oliver (1867–1948), American congressman
William M. Oliver (1792–1863), American lawyer and politician
Bill Oliver (politician), Canadian politician

Other
Sir William Oliver (British Army officer) (1901–1981), British general
Sir William Oliver (businessman) (1885–1962), Scottish business advisor
William Oliver (footballer) (1892–?), English footballer
William Oliver (physician) (1695–1764), inventor of the Bath Oliver biscuit
William J. Oliver (1774–1827), 19th-century informer and supposed agent provocateur
William J. Oliver (industrialist) (1867–1925), early 20th century American contractor
William Pearly Oliver (1912–1989), instrumental in developing organizations to support Black Nova Scotians
William Silver Oliver (1836–1908), Irish-born Canadian military surgeon
Bill Oliver (born 1939), college football coach

See also